Hannah Collin (born 18 February 1982) is an English former professional tennis player.

Collin competed at her home Grand Slam, Wimbledon, on three consecutive occasions from 2000 to 2002 and also for Great Britain in the Europe/Africa Zone at the 2000 edition of the Fed Cup.

Considered to be one of Britain's most promising young players in the 1990s, at a time when British tennis was doing particularly poorly, she reached the quarter-finals of the Wimbledon juniors' tournament, and was the national 14, 16 and 18 year old age group champion. 

She played her first match on the ITF circuit in 1997 and her final professional match at the Wimbledon qualifying event in 2005. During her career, she reached a total of seven ITF singles finals (winning three) and managed to notch up a victory over former British number one, Sam Smith. She also managed to beat Justine Henin and Kim Clijsters.

ITF Circuit finals

Singles (3–4)

Doubles (2–7)

Performance timelines

Singles

Doubles

Fed Cup

Post-retirement life
After retiring, Collin became a tennis coach. She is currently a coach at the All England Club at Wimbledon.

References

External links
 
 
 

Living people
1982 births
English female tennis players
British female tennis players
Tennis people from Surrey